The year 1906 in radio involved some significant events.

Events
 3 October – The first International Radiotelegraph Convention opens in Berlin.
 24 December – Reginald Fessenden makes the first radio broadcast: a poetry reading, a violin solo and a speech.
 Lee de Forest invents the audion (triode).

Births
 14 January – William Bendix, American film, radio and television actor (died 1964)
 19 January – Lanny Ross, American singer, pianist and songwriter (died 1988)
 8 February – Harman Grisewood, English radio actor and administrator (died 1997)
 20 February – James Jewell, American radio actor, producer and director (died 1975)
 24 April – William Joyce, American-born Nazi propagandist (executed 1946)
 13 May – Eileen Fowler, English fitness instructor (died 2000)

References

 
Radio by year